Baines School is a secondary school in Poulton-Le-Fylde, Lancashire, England. It was founded through James Baines will in 1717 and is a former grammar school.

It was one of three schools set up in Baines' will, the others being at Marton and Thornton.
teaching around 100 pupils without charging fees. Baines will also provided payments to the poor of the area and apprenticeships.

Notable former pupils

 Joe-Warren Plant, child actor, best known for his role of Jacob Gallagher in Emmerdale 
 Michael P Barnett, chemist and computer scientist
 Arnold Beckett,  pharmacist, and expert on doping in sport
 Daniel Whiston, professional ice skater
 Ian Stuart Donaldson, lead singer of Skrewdriver
 Barry Mason, songwriter
 Dave Durie, professional footballer
 Fred Pagnam, professional footballer
 Richard Gleeson, professional cricketer

References

Buildings and structures in Poulton-le-Fylde
Schools in the Borough of Wyre
Secondary schools in Lancashire
Voluntary aided schools in England